Anastasia Myskina and Ai Sugiyama were the defending champions, but none competed this year, with Myskina competing at the Fed Cup final during the same week.

Anna-Lena Grönefeld and Meghann Shaughnessy won the title by defeating Yan Zi and Zheng Jie 6–3, 6–3 in the final.

Seeds

Draw

Draw

External links
 Main and Qualifying Rounds (WTA)
 ITF tournament edition details

2005 WTA Tour
Commonwealth Bank Tennis Classic
Sport in Indonesia